Peter Joseph is an American independent filmmaker and activist. He is best known for the Zeitgeist film series, which he wrote, directed, narrated, scored, and produced. He is also the founder of the related Zeitgeist Movement. Other work by Joseph includes the 2017 book The New Human Rights Movement: Reinventing the Economy to End Oppression.

Career
Joseph was born in Winston-Salem, North Carolina in 1979 and attended the University of North Carolina and The New School.

In 2009, he founded The Zeitgeist Movement, a self-described "sustainability advocacy organization". It was originally started as the "activist arm" of an organization called The Venus Project, launched by Jacque Fresco in 1994. In 2011, the two organizations separated. Joseph's work with the movement and the Zeitgeist film trilogy has been the subject of national media attention, including articles in The New York Times, The Palm Beach Post, VC Reporter, and TheMarker.

Since 2011, Joseph has supported the Occupy movement.

In 2012, he created the satirical miniseries Culture in decline, which challenges various contemporary cultural phenomena. 

In March 2017, BenBella Books published The New Human Rights Movement, authored by Joseph. Abby Martin discussed his views in the book and generally in an interview on Telesur.

Publications

See also
 Acharya S
 Post-scarcity economy
 Technocracy

References

External links
 
 Who Is Peter Joseph?, 2009 documentary by Charles Robinson

1979 births
American activists
American conspiracy theorists
American documentary film directors
American political writers
Anti-consumerists
Date of birth missing (living people)
Living people
Sustainability advocates
The Zeitgeist Movement
Writers about activism and social change